Anié is a prefecture located in the Plateaux Region of Togo.

Canton (administrative divisions) of Anié include Anié, Pallakoko, Kolo-Kopé, Adogbénou, Glitto, and Atchinèdji.

References 

Prefectures of Togo